State Highway 270, abbreviated as SH-270, is a  state highway in Oklahoma and Pottawatomie counties in Oklahoma, United States. It runs on a former alignment of U.S. Route 270 (US-270) between US-62 in Harrah and US-177 north of Shawnee. (US-270 is now concurrent with Interstate 40 through the area.) SH-270 has no lettered spur routes.

Route description

State Highway 270 begins at US-62 in Harrah, in Oklahoma County. The road runs through town on a southeast course, paralleling a rail line. As it leaves town, the highway gradually curves to the south. SH-270 runs along Harrah Road to S.E. 29th Street, where it makes a hard left, turning to the east.

SH-270 continues east for  until it crosses into Pottawatomie County, where the name of the road changes to Oklahoma Street. SH-270 then enters McLoud, where it has a brief concurrency with SH-102. After leaving McLoud, it then turns back to the southeast, parallel to the same railroad it ran alongside in Harrah. SH-270 turns east upon reaching the small town of Dale. It then crosses over the railroad and the North Canadian River. After passing through Dale, it ends at US-177.

History
Prior to 1979, US-270 ran through Oklahoma City on surface streets. It left the city and ran through Choctaw concurrent with US-62. US-270 split away from US-62 in Harrah, and continued on to Shawnee on what is now SH-270.

On March 5, 1979, US-270 was rerouted to run concurrent with Interstate 40 from south of Calumet in Canadian County through the Oklahoma City metro, exiting the Interstate onto a surface alignment in Shawnee. Presumably, SH-270 was commissioned the same date. The realignment of US-270, with SH-270 on the old alignment between Harrah and Shawnee, appears on the 1979 state map. SH-270 followed the same path in 1979 as it does today.

Junction list

See also

References

External links

 SH-270 at OKHighways

270
Transportation in Oklahoma County, Oklahoma
Transportation in Pottawatomie County, Oklahoma